Kąp  is a village in the administrative district of Gmina Giżycko, within Giżycko County, Warmian-Masurian Voivodeship, in north-eastern Poland. It is located in the historic region of Masuria.

For centuries, the village was inhabited by Poles, and as of 1625, it had an exclusively Polish population.

References

Villages in Giżycko County